Gaëtan Antony Varenne (born 24 June 1990) is a professional footballer who plays as a forward for Israeli Premier League club Bnei Sakhnin. He holds both French and Israeli citizenship.

Early years 
Varenne was born in Le Puy-en-Velay, France, and played for local club Le Puy en Velay from 1998 to 2004, punctuated by a brief stint at Toulon during the 2000–01 season. He joined the training club Montferrand where he remained for four seasons between 2004 and 2008, before being spotted by Clermont Foot with whom he played in U19 national the following season. Following this, Varenne was released by Clermont Foot Cournon in Auvergne.

Club career 
In the course of three seasons with CFA2 side FC Cournon-d'Auvergne, he gradually made a starting spot and became the top scorer of all Amateur Championships in France with no less than 28 goals. Varenne scored 11 goals in 2011–12 season, coming in second in the group. With this accomplishment, Clermont, Nantes, Bastia, Ajaccio and Dijon all showed interest. Varenne, overtaken by a trial in Dijon; on 27 June 2012 signed a two-year contract with the Corsican club Bastia. In November 2013, his contract with Bastia was terminated by mutual agreement.

In December 2013, Varenne signed with Israeli Premier League club F.C. Ashdod until the end of the year. After one goal and some exhibitions, he was injured and finished the season without a club. In summer 2014, after several unsuccessful trials in France, Varenne signed a two-year contract with Israeli 2nd division side Maccabi Yavne. Following this, he signed a two-year contract with Hapoel Jerusalem. After a very hopeful second season with Hapoel, Varenne signed a two-year contract with fellow Israeli Premier League side Beitar Jerusalem. He scored three goals during 2019–20 Toto Cup Al, and was the top scorer among Beitar players, leading To Beitar Jerusalem to win the cup.

In 2018, he was voted talent of the Year of the Israeli Premier League.

Sexual assault 
In March 2018, a video was released which showed Varenne and other, unnamed footballers sexually assaulting an unconscious woman. The Israel Football Association chose to not summon Varenne for a disciplinary hearing which received criticism from Michal Rozin of the Meretz party who also called for the player to be fired and his behaviour to be condemned. Varenne's club Beitar Jerusalem did not take any action either.

Honours 
Beitar Jerusalem
 Toto Cup: 2019–20

References

External links 
 
 
 Gaëtan Varenne FC Cournon Profile

1990 births
Living people
20th-century French Jews
Jewish footballers
French footballers
Israeli footballers
SC Toulon players
AS Montferrand Football players
Clermont Foot players
SC Bastia players
F.C. Ashdod players
Maccabi Yavne F.C. players
Hapoel Jerusalem F.C. players
Beitar Jerusalem F.C. players
Hapoel Be'er Sheva F.C. players
Bnei Sakhnin F.C. players
Ligue 1 players
Israeli Premier League players
Liga Leumit players
French emigrants to Israel
People from Le Puy-en-Velay
Sportspeople from Haute-Loire
Association football forwards
French people of Moroccan-Jewish descent
Footballers from Auvergne-Rhône-Alpes